The 2023 Western Carolina Catamounts football team will represent Western Carolina University as a member of the Southern Conference during the 2023 NCAA Division I FCS football season. They are led by head coach Kerwin Bell, who was coaching his third season with the program. The Catamounts play their home games at E.J. Whitmire Stadium in Cullowhee, North Carolina.

Schedule

Game summaries

at Arkansas

Samford

at Eastern Kentucky

Charleston Southern

at The Citadel

at Chattanooga

Furman

Mercer

at Wofford

East Tennessee State

at VMI

Personnel

Coaching staff

Roster

Statistics

Team

Individual leaders

Defense 

Key: POS: Position, SOLO: Solo Tackles, AST: Assisted Tackles, TOT: Total Tackles, TFL: Tackles-for-loss, SACK: Quarterback Sacks, INT: Interceptions, BU: Passes Broken Up, PD: Passes Defended, QBH: Quarterback Hits, FR: Fumbles Recovered, FF: Forced Fumbles, BLK: Kicks or Punts Blocked, SAF: Safeties, TD : Touchdown

Special teams

References 

Western Carolina Catamounts
Western Carolina Catamounts football seasons
Western Carolina Catamounts